Idles are a British-Irish rock band. Formed in Bristol in 2009, the band consists of Joe Talbot (vocals), Mark Bowen (guitar), Lee Kiernan (guitar), Adam Devonshire (bass) and Jon Beavis (drums). The band released five extended plays before they released their debut album, Brutalism in 2017. Brutalism was met to critical acclaim, as was their second and third studio albums, Joy as an Act of Resistance in 2018, and Ultra Mono in 2020. The band's latest album, Crawler, was released on 12 November 2021.

Albums

Studio albums

Live albums

Extended plays

Demos

Singles

Other appearances

Remixes

Music videos

Guest features
 Wish  (from the Anna Calvi album, Hunted)
 None of Us Are Getting Out of This Alive (from The Streets mixtape, None of Us Are Getting Out of This Alive)

Notes

References

External links
 Official website
 
 Idles discography at Allmusic

Discographies of British artists
Idles

de:Idles/Diskografie